Prudence Hero Napier (née Rutherford) (1916 – 6, June 1997) was one of Britain's most eminent primatologists, and the world's leading expert on the taxonomy of primates. She was the widow of the  primatologist, John Napier.

Biography
Prudence was born in Liverpool in 1916, the daughter of Sir Hugo Rutherford. In 1936 she married John Napier, a surgeon who was developing a particular interest in the hand. During the 1950s he became convinced that human functional anatomy could not be properly understood without a knowledge of non-human primates and, with Prudence's help, founded the Unit of Primatology in the Royal Free Hospital School of Medicine, which was the first centre in Great Britain devoted to the study of non-human primates.

Prudence joined her husband in his work and increasingly set out on her own.  She contributed to A Handbook of Living Primates (New York: Academic Press, 1967, with John Russell Napier), the first book of its kind.

She was the foremost contributor to children's books on non-human primates during the 1960s and 1970s.

Selected bibliography
 1967: A Handbook of Living Primates (New York: Academic Press, with John Russell Napier)
 1970: Old World Monkeys: Evolution, Systematics, and Behavior (New York: Academic Press, with John Russell Napier)
 1974: Chimpanzees (London: Bodley Head)
 1977: Lemurs, Lorises, and Bushbabies (London: Bodley Head, with Colin Threadgall)
 1988: The Natural History of the Primates (Cambridge: MIT Press, with John Russell Napier)

References

1916 births
1997 deaths
Women primatologists
Primatologists
British paleoanthropologists
20th-century British zoologists
Scientists from Liverpool
20th-century British women scientists
British women anthropologists
Daughters of baronets